The 2000 FIFA Club World Championship final was an association football match that took place at Estádio do Maracanã, Rio de Janeiro on 14 January 2000. It was an all-Brazilian final between Corinthians and Vasco da Gama to determine the winner of the 2000 FIFA Club World Championship. After a goalless draw during the 120 minutes, Corinthians won the penalty shoot-out 4–3, becoming the first club to lift the FIFA Club World Cup, and the first side to beat a side from their home country in the final.

Match

Details

References

External links
FIFA Club World Championship Brazil 2000 at FIFA.com

 

Final
Sport Club Corinthians Paulista matches
CR Vasco da Gama matches
World
2000
International sports competitions in Rio de Janeiro (city)
2000s in Rio de Janeiro
FIFA Club World Cup Final 2000